The 1990 New Mexico gubernatorial election took place on November 6, 1990, in order to elect the Governor of New Mexico. Due to term limits, incumbent Republican Garrey Carruthers was ineligible to seek a second term as governor.

, this was the most recent New Mexico gubernatorial election in which both major party candidates are now deceased.

Democratic primary
Former Governor Bruce King won the Democratic primary, defeating former Attorney General Paul Bardacke and 2 other candidates.

Results

Republican primary
The Republican primary was won by Frank Bond, who defeated Les Houston, James A. Caudell, and former mayor of Albuquerque Harry E. Kinney.

Results

General election

Results

References

1990
gubernatorial
New Mexico